Eze Ukwu (born 1799–1862) was the 15th Obi of Otolo and Igwe of Nnewi kingdom. He was the traditional supreme ruler and spiritual leader in Nnewi, an Igbo city in Nigeria. He was a member of the Nnofo Royal lineage and the successor to his father Eze Chukwu. Unlike most Igbo monarchies, there were kings of Nnewi before the arrival of Europeans.

Reign 
 
During his reign, important events took place. He declined to accept the advice of his uncle, Eze Enwe, to bring to consummation a war fought half-way against the Amichis. Eze Enwe therefore took up the job. He invaded the Amichis and conquered them, crowning this achievement with the capture and execution of Nwamkpi, their leader. he successfully waged another war against Ųkpo and participated in the successful invasion of Orifite. These astounding successes qualified him for the heroic title of "Onuo ora", which entitled one to the possession of Ikponasato, that is, (eight very small bells).

Besides okafo, the first son of Eze Ukwu, he had also the following sons - Eze Oruchalu and Unaegbu.  When Eze ukwu died, Igwe Okafo, his eldest son, became the sixteenth chief.

References

Igbo monarchs
Nnewi monarchs
Nigerian traditional rulers
People from Nnewi
1799 births
1862 deaths